Brian Crawford (born 27 July 1978, in Lanark), is a former Scottish football striker and is currently manager of Larkhall Thistle F.C.

Crawford began his career with junior side Carluke Rovers, before moving to Fauldhouse United and then to Cumbernauld United. Crawford's good form saw him earn a move to the senior game, joining Clyde in December 2000. He made 42 appearances in total for the Bully Wee, scoring 18 goals. He joined Stenhousemuir in May 2002.  This was followed by a spell at Stranraer, before he returned to the juniors, signing for Shotts Bon Accord in 2005. He scored 32 goals in 26 games but unfortunately in September of that year he had cruciate injury and was out for the best part of a year. He returned after this time out only to sustain the same injury which effectively ended his career at the age of 27.

External links

Living people
1978 births
Scottish footballers
Clyde F.C. players
Stenhousemuir F.C. players
Stranraer F.C. players
Scottish Football League players
Shotts Bon Accord F.C. players
Cumbernauld United F.C. players
Sportspeople from Lanark
Association football forwards
Scottish Junior Football Association players
Fauldhouse United F.C. players
Carluke Rovers F.C. players
Forth Wanderers F.C. players
Scottish Junior Football Association managers
Footballers from South Lanarkshire